This is a sortable list of compositions by Antonín Dvořák. There is a separate list by genre.
Below is a sortable list of compositions by Antonín Dvořák.  The works are categorized by Jarmil Burghauser catalogue number (B.), opus number (when applicable), date of composition, titles, and genre.

External links
 Complete list on a comprehensive Dvorak site
 

 
Dvorak
Dvorak
Dvorak